Cratesiclea (died 219 BC), was a Spartan queen, married to king Leonidas II of Sparta. 

During the reign of her spouse, her foreign origin was used by the opposition of her husband, as Spartan law declared that the queens of Sparta must be Spartan. After the death of her husband, she married the Spartan Megistonoo.  She was known for her active support of her son Cleomenes III.  During the Cleomenide War, she left Sparta for Alexandria in Egypt in custody of her two grandsons, to act as a hostage of her son's ally Ptolemy III  of Egypt.  In 222, Cleomenes III joined his mother and sons in Egypt after his deposition.  When he failed to secure support with Ptolemy IV of Egypt to retake his throne, he attempted to rebel the population of Alexandria against Ptolemay IV.  In retaliation, Ptolemaios IV had both him, his followers as well as his mother and two young sons executed. 

Issue

 Cleomenes III
 Chilonis (wife of Cleombrotus II)

References

3rd-century BC Greek women
Ancient Spartan queens consort
3rd-century BC Spartans
219 BC deaths
Murdered royalty